Miconia tomentosa is a species of shrub or treelet in the family Melastomataceae. It is native to South America.

References

Flora of Peru
tomentosa
Least concern plants
Taxonomy articles created by Polbot